The tubax is a modified contrabass saxophone developed in 1999 by the German instrument maker Benedikt Eppelsheim. Although it has the same fingering as the saxophone, it has a narrower bore, smaller mouthpiece, and more compactly folded tubing. The tubax exists in E♭ contrabass and B♭ or C subcontrabass sizes. Its name is a portmanteau of the words "tuba" and "sax".

History 
The first size of tubax to be developed was the E♭ tubax. It first appeared in 1998, and was intended as a more practical alternative to the somewhat unwieldy contrabass saxophone.

The larger B♭ tubax appeared soon after and is equivalent to the subcontrabass saxophone, which although envisioned by Adolphe Sax in his 1846 patent, was only first built in 2010 by Brazilian manufacturer J'Élle Stainer. This subcontrabass size is also available in C, but only one model has been manufactured, sold to Thomas Mejer of Switzerland in July 2002.

Construction
The E♭ and B♭ tubax have the same lengths of tubing and ranges as the contrabass and subcontrabass saxophones respectively, but are much more compact. They are built with a narrower bore somewhere between a regular saxophone and a contrabass sarrusophone, and use comparatively smaller baritone or bass saxophone mouthpieces. These smaller sizes and more accessible key placements result in more portable and ergonomical instruments.

These changes result in a more focused and compact timbre than that of the full-sized saxophones, and have also lead to some debate over whether the tubax is really a member of the saxophone family.

Notable tubax performers

 Paul Cohen
 Yo-yo Su
 Dror Feiler
 Blaise Garza
 Vinny Golia
 Mats Gustafsson
 Oliver Saar
 Jarno Sarkula
 Steffen Schorn
 Jim Sheppard*
 Marcus Weiss

References

External links
 Benedikt Eppelsheim Website
 Fred Bayer's Tubax Page
 Article about CD featuring tubax
 Jay C. Easton's B♭ Tubax page
  tubax -- earthquake saxophone Masayuki Kuroda's page

Listening
 MP3 of a tubax being played by Randy Emerick, with the Jerry Fischer Orchestra, Hollywood Florida (playing "Stardust", arr. by Mike Lewis)
 MP3 of two B♭ subcontrabass tubaxes (overdubbed), playing movement 1 of Duet for Basses by Walter S. Hartley, performed by Jay C. Easton

Saxophones
Contrabass instruments
1999 musical instruments